NASA John H. Glenn Research Center at Lewis Field is a NASA center within the cities of Brook Park and Cleveland between Cleveland Hopkins International Airport and the Rocky River Reservation of Cleveland Metroparks, with a subsidiary facility in Sandusky, Ohio. Its acting director is James A. Kenyon. Glenn Research Center is one of ten major NASA facilities, whose primary mission is to develop science and technology for use in aeronautics and space. , it employed about 1,650 civil servants and 1,850 support contractors on or near its site.

In 2010, the formerly on-site NASA Visitors Center moved to the Great Lakes Science Center in the North Coast Harbor area of downtown Cleveland.

History

The installation was established in 1942 as part of the National Advisory Committee for Aeronautics (NACA) and was later incorporated into the National Aeronautics and Space Administration as a laboratory for aircraft engine research.

It was first named the Aircraft Engine Research Laboratory after funding was approved in June 1940. It was renamed the Flight Propulsion Research Laboratory in 1947, the Lewis Flight Propulsion Laboratory (LFPL) in 1948 (after George W. Lewis, the head of NACA from 1919 to 1947), and the NASA Lewis Research Center in 1958.

On March 1, 1999, the center was officially renamed the NASA John H. Glenn Research Center at Lewis Field, in honor of John Glenn, who was a fighter pilot, astronaut (the first American to orbit the Earth) and a politician.

As early as 1951, researchers at the LFPL were studying the combustion processes in liquid rocket engines.

Facilities

Neil A. Armstrong Test Facility

The  NASA John H. Glenn Research Center at the Neil A. Armstrong Test Facility or just Neil A. Armstrong Test Facility, formerly the NASA John H. Glenn Research Center at Plum Brook Station or just Plum Brook Station, in southern Erie County, Ohio, near Sandusky, is also part of Glenn. It specializes in very large scale tests that would be hazardous on the main campus.

 the station consisted of five major facilities:
 B-2 Spacecraft Propulsion Research Facility
 Combined Effects Chamber: never used and unusable
 Cryogenic Components Laboratory: slated for demolition
 Hypersonic Test Facility
 Space Power Facility

The Plum Brook Reactor was decontaminated and decommissioned under a 2008 cost-plus-fee contract valued at more than $33.5 million.

In 2019 the U.S. senators from Ohio, Rob Portman and Sherrod Brown, proposed to rename Plum Brook Station after Neil Armstrong. The legislation was signed into law on December 30, 2020, and Plum Brook Station was renamed the Neil A. Armstrong Test Facility.

B-2 Spacecraft Propulsion Research Facility

The B-2 Spacecraft Propulsion Research Facility is the world's only facility capable of testing full-scale, upper-stage launch vehicles and rocket engines under simulated high-altitude conditions. The Space Power Facility houses the world's largest space environment vacuum chamber.

Icing Research Tunnel 
The icing Research Tunnel is a wind tunnel capable of simulating atmospheric icing condition to test the effect of ice accretion on aircraft wings and body as well as to test anti-icing systems for aircraft.

Zero Gravity Research Facility 

The Zero Gravity Research Facility is a vertical vacuum chamber used for dropping experiment payloads for testing in microgravity. It was designated a National Historic Landmark in 1985. The facility uses vertical drop tests in a vacuum chamber to investigate the behavior of components, systems, liquids, gases, and combustion in such circumstances.

The pressure in this vacuum chamber is reduced to 13.3 newtons per square meter (1.3atm) before use.

After the closing of the Japan Microgravity Centre (JAMIC), the NASA Zero-G facility is the largest microgravity facility in the world.

Another, smaller drop tower remains in use with a free fall time of 2.2 seconds.  The smaller tower has a significantly reduced cost per drop and the Dropping In Microgravity Environment (DIME) educational program is conducted there.

Significant developments

Aeronautics science and technology

NASA Glenn does significant research and technology development on jet engines, producing designs that reduce energy consumption, pollution, and noise. The chevrons it invented for noise reduction appear on many commercial jet engines today, including the Boeing 787 Dreamliner.

Space science and technology
The Glenn Research Center, along with its partners in industry, are credited with the following:
 The liquid hydrogen rocket engine, which Wernher von Braun credited as being the critical technology leading to the Apollo Moon landings
 The Centaur upper stage rocket
 The gridded ion thruster, which is a high-efficiency engine for spaceflight. A Glenn-derived ion engine was used on the successful NASA probe Deep Space 1.
 The Electrical Power System for Space Station Freedom, which, except for minor modifications, is used on the International Space Station.

Significant contributions

List of core competencies

NASA Glenn's core competencies are:
 Air-breathing propulsion
 Communications technology and development
 Space propulsion and cryogenic fluids management
 Power, energy storage, and conversion
 Materials and structures for extreme environments

Education

The Glenn Research Center is home to the Lewis' Educational and Research Collaborative Internship Program (LERCIP). It provides internships for high school and college students and high school teachers. The high school program is an eight-week internship for sophomores and juniors with interests in science, technology, engineering, math, or professional administration. The college level consists of a 10-week internship and is open to college students at all levels. Only residents of the Cleveland area are eligible for high school LERCIP, but college LERCIP is open to students nationwide. Interns work closely with their NASA mentors and are involved in the daily activities of the center. They are expected to be available to work 40 hours a week for the duration of the internship. The LERCIP Teacher program is a 10-week internship for educators in STEM fields.

Other

The Dropping In Microgravity Environment is an annual contest held yearly by the center. Teams of high school students write proposals for experiments to be performed in the Drop Tower. The winners travel to the center, perform their experiments, and submit a research report to NASA.

Future 
After 2004, NASA had been shifting its focus towards space exploration as mandated by the Vision for Space Exploration. Because of this, it was perceived by some that regional NASA centers like Glenn, which focus on research and technology, were becoming more and more marginalized in terms of resources and relevance. However, on May 13, 2006, it was announced that NASA Glenn Research Center had secured management of the Crew Exploration Vehicle's service module, which promised to generate billions of dollars and hundreds of jobs for the center.  This work secured the center's future in the near term, and signalled a shift in priority for the center from aeronautical research to space exploration, aligning itself closer with NASA's new mission.

Another change of direction created uncertainty in 2010, however, when President Obama and Congress declared the end of the Vision for Space Exploration and sought to chart a new course for human space flight and NASA.  However, the 2015 budget for NASA made substantial increases to projects in which the Research Center participates, such as aeronautics research, planetary science and space technology, and some of that funding was expected to flow down to the center.

NASA Glenn Visitor Center

The Visitor Center closed in September 2009 with many displays shifted to the Great Lakes Science Center, and new ones created there.  This move was done to reduce the public relations budget and to provide easier access to the general public, especially the under-served community.  It was hoped that putting the displays at the much more visited science center will bring the NASA Glenn facility more public exposure.  In fact, this proved true: compared to the 60,000 visitors per year at its former site, the Glenn Visitor Center enjoyed 330,000 visitors in the first year at the Great Lakes Science Center.  The new display area at the science center is referred to as the Glenn Visitor Center.

The NASA Glenn Research Center also offers public tours of its research facilities on the first Saturday of each month. Reservations must be made in advance.

See also
 Journey Through the Solar System

References

External links

 NASA.gov: official Glenn Research Center website
 NASA Glenn Visitor Center
 Engines and Innovation: Lewis Laboratory and American Propulsion Technology (NASA SP-4306, 1991)—The whole book, including photos and diagrams in on-line format.
Historic American Engineering Record documentation, filed under Cleveland, Cuyahoga County, OH:

 
1942 establishments in Ohio
Aerospace research institutes
Aviation research institutes
Economy of Cleveland
Geography of Cleveland
Historic American Engineering Record in Ohio
NASA facilities
Organizations based in Cleveland
Research institutes in Ohio
Science and technology in Ohio
Space technology research institutes
NASA research centers
Neil Armstrong